The Frighteners is a 1996 supernatural comedy horror film directed by Peter Jackson and co-written with  Fran Walsh. The film stars Michael J. Fox, Trini Alvarado, Peter Dobson, John Astin, Dee Wallace Stone, Jeffrey Combs, R. Lee Ermey and Jake Busey. The Frighteners tells the story of Frank Bannister (Fox), an architect who practices necromancy, developing psychic abilities allowing him to see, hear, and communicate with ghosts after his wife's murder. He initially uses his new abilities to befriend ghosts, whom he sends to haunt people so that he can charge them handsome fees for "exorcising" the ghosts. However, the spirit of a mass murderer appears able to attack the living and the dead, posing as the ghost of the Grim Reaper, prompting Frank to investigate the supernatural presence.

Jackson and Walsh conceived the idea for The Frighteners during the script-writing phase of Heavenly Creatures. Executive producer Robert Zemeckis hired the duo to write the script, with the original intention of Zemeckis directing The Frighteners as a spin-off film of the television series, Tales from the Crypt. With Jackson and Walsh's first draft submitted in January 1994, Zemeckis believed the film would be better off directed by Jackson, produced by Zemeckis and funded/distributed by Universal Studios. The visual effects were created by Jackson's Weta Digital, which had only been in existence for three years. This, plus the fact that The Frighteners required more digital effects shots than almost any movie made until that time, resulted in the eighteen-month period for effects work by Weta Digital being largely stressed.

Despite a rushed post-production schedule, Universal was so impressed with Jackson's rough cut on The Frighteners, the studio moved the theatrical release date up by three months. The film was not a box office success, but received generally positive reviews from critics. The film gained a cult following and is considered a cult classic on Jackson’s catalog.

Plot

In 1990, Debra Bannister dies in a car accident. Her husband, Frank, abandons architecture, and his unfinished "dream house" sits incomplete. Following the accident, Frank gains the power to see ghosts, and he befriends three: 1970s street gangster Cyrus, 1950s nerd Stuart, and The Judge, an Old West gunslinger. The ghosts haunt houses so Frank can then "exorcise" them for a fee. Most locals consider him a con man.

Soon after Frank cons local health advocate Ray Lynskey and his wife Lucy, a physician, Ray dies of a heart attack. Frank discovers that there is an entity, appearing as the Grim Reaper, killing people, first marking numbers on their foreheads that only Frank sees. Debra had a similar number when she was found.

Frank's ability to foretell the murders puts him under suspicion with the police and FBI agent Milton Dammers, who is convinced Frank is responsible. The newspaper editor Magda Rees-Jones attacks him in the press.  After Frank fails to save Rees-Jones from the Grim Reaper, he is charged with her murder.

Lucy investigates the murders and becomes the Grim Reaper's target while visiting Frank in jail. They escape with the help of Cyrus and Stuart, who are both dissolved in the process. Lucy helps Frank have a near-death experience by putting him into hypothermia and using barbiturates to stop his heart. Dammers abducts Lucy, revealing that he had been a victim of the Manson Family.

In his ghostly form, Frank confronts the Grim Reaper and discovers that he is the ghost of Johnny Bartlett, a psychiatric hospital orderly was executed for killing twelve people in 1964. Newspaper reports reveal that his greatest desire was to become the most prolific serial killer. Patricia Bradley, then a teenager, was accused of being his accomplice, although she escaped the death penalty due to being underage. Lucy resuscitates Frank, and they visit Patricia. Unknown to them, Patricia is still in love with Bartlett and on friendly terms with his ghost. Patricia eventually kills her mother, who had been trying to monitor her daughter's behavior. Lucy and Frank trap Bartlett's spirit in his urn, which Patricia has kept. The pair make for the chapel of the now-abandoned psychiatric hospital hoping to send Bartlett's ghost to Hell.

Patricia and Dammers chase them through the ruins. Dammers throws the ashes away, releasing Bartlett's ghost again, and Patricia kills Dammers. Bartlett's ghost and Patricia chase Frank and Lucy. Frank realizes that Bartlett's ghost, with Patricia's help, was responsible for his wife's death and the number on her brow, and that he is still trying to add to his body count (and infamy) even after his death.

Out of bullets, Patricia strangles Frank to death, but Frank in spirit form rips Patricia's spirit from her body, forcing Bartlett to follow them. Bartlett grabs Patricia's ghost, while Frank makes it to Heaven, where he is reunited with Cyrus, Stuart, and wife Debra. Bartlett and Patricia's spirits claim they will now go back to claim more lives, but the portal to Heaven quickly changes to a demonic-looking appearance and they are both dragged to Hell by a giant worm-like creature. Frank learns it is not yet his time and is sent back to his body as Debra's spirit tells him to "be happy".

Frank and Lucy fall in love. Lucy is now able to see ghosts as well. Frank demolishes the unfinished dream house and builds a life with Lucy. The morose-looking ghost of Dammers rides around in the Sheriff Walt Perry's car. Perry, who is also Frank's friend, approaches him and reveals that the police discovered a huge collection of Ouija Boards in Patricia's room. This causes Frank to realize that Patricia used them to bring Bartlett back to the world of the living.

Cast

 Michael J. Fox as Frank Bannister, a former architect turned ghost hunter after the trauma of his wife dying. Although Jackson and Walsh envisioned The Frighteners as a low-budget film with unknown actors, Zemeckis suggested casting his Back to the Future star Fox in the lead role. Fox became enthusiastic about working with Jackson when he saw Heavenly Creatures at the Toronto International Film Festival.
 Trini Alvarado as Lucy Lynskey, a physician that Frank meets. The character is named after Heavenly Creatures star Melanie Lynskey (who also cameos in The Frighteners).
 Peter Dobson as Ray Lynskey, Lucy's health-obsessed and comically hot-headed husband who dislikes Frank's tactics
 John Astin as The Judge, a decaying gunslinger ghost from the Old West with a penchant for mummies and firing guns at random. 
 Jeffrey Combs as Milton Dammers, an eccentric FBI agent who has a vendetta against Bannister. A former undercover agent known for his work with cultists, which caused him to sustain multiple massive mutilations and drove him to the brink of insanity, he has a problem with women screaming at him. Jackson opted to cast Combs as Dammers because he was a fan of the actor's work in Re-Animator.
 Dee Wallace Stone as Patricia Bradley, inspired by Caril Ann Fugate. Bartlett's mentally ill lover (escaping execution at the time of the original murders as she was underage) who is under strict observation by her mother.
 Jake Busey as Johnny Bartlett, a mass murderer inspired by Charles Starkweather sharing the last name of his second and third victims, girlfriend and accomplice Caril Ann Fugate's mother and step-father Velda and Marion Bartlett. He continues his work in the afterlife, focusing on increasing his body count as a form of competition with other famous murderers. He returns from Hell, able to attack the living and the dead posing as the Grim Reaper.
 Chi McBride as Cyrus, a gangster who is one of Frank's deceased associates for his ghost-hunting business.
 Jim Fyfe as Stuart, a nerd who is one of Frank's deceased associates for his ghost-hunting business.
 Troy Evans as Sheriff Walt Perry, a local law enforcement officer and ally to Frank.
 Julianna McCarthy as Old Lady Bradley, Patricia's mother and former director of the psychiatric hospital, who is constantly monitoring her daughter.
 R. Lee Ermey as Hiles, the ghost of a Master Sergeant. Ermey's performance in this film is heavily reminiscent of his performance as Gunnery Sergeant Hartman in the 1987 film Full Metal Jacket, sharing many mannerisms with the aforementioned character.
 Elizabeth Hawthorne as Magda Rees-Jones, the snooty British editor of the local newspaper who later dies by a car crash.

In addition, Peter Jackson cameos as a man with piercings, his son Billy is a baby in a bouncer, Melanie Lynskey cameos as the deputy who is briefly seen standing next to Lucy Lynskey, Byron McCrawerly plays Victim #38 and Angela Bloomfield plays Frank's deceased wife, Debra.

Development
Peter Jackson and co-writer Fran Walsh conceived the idea for The Frighteners in 1992, during the script-writing phase of Heavenly Creatures. Together, they wrote a three-page film treatment and sent it to their talent agent in Hollywood. Robert Zemeckis viewed their treatment with the intention of directing The Frighteners as a spin-off film of the television series, Tales from the Crypt (which he helped produce). Zemeckis hired Jackson and Walsh to turn their treatment into a full-length screenplay in January 1993. The husband and wife duo completed their first draft for The Frighteners in early-January 1994. Zemeckis was so impressed with their script, he decided The Frighteners would work better directed by Jackson, executive produced by Zemeckis and funded/distributed by Universal Pictures. Universal green-lighted the film to commence pre-production on a $26 million budget in April 1994. The studio also granted Jackson and Zemeckis total artistic control and the right of final cut privilege.

Production
Jackson decided to film The Frighteners entirely in New Zealand. Zemeckis and Universal agreed on the condition that Jackson made New Zealand look similar to the Midwestern United States. Principal photography began on May 14, 1995, and lasted until November 16, which is one of the longest shooting schedules ever approved by Universal Pictures. Six weeks into the shoot, cinematographer Alun Bollinger had a serious car accident. His replacement, John Blick, later alternated duties with Bollinger for much of the rest of the shoot. Location shooting primarily included Wellington and three weeks spent in Lyttelton. Interior scenes were compiled at Camperdown Studios in Miramar.

Visual effects
Jackson's Weta Digital created the visual effects, which included computer-generated imagery, as well as scale models (which were necessary to make Lyttelton look American), prosthetic makeup and practical effects with help from Weta Workshop. Visual effects supervisor Richard Taylor explained that effects work on The Frighteners was complex due to Weta's inexperience with computer technology in the mid-1990s. Prior to this film, Weta worked largely with physical effects. With so many ghosts among its main cast, The Frighteners required more digital effects shots than almost any movie made up till that time. For a special effects company that had been in existence less than three years, the eighteen-month period for completing The Frighteners was largely stressful. Some shots were handled by a small New Zealand company called Pixel Perfect, many of whose employees would eventually join Weta Digital. Rick Baker was hired to design the prosthetic makeup for The Judge, portrayed by John Astin (the detachable jawbone was later added digitally). However, Baker was not able to apply Astin's five hours of makeup due to his commitment on The Nutty Professor. Makeup artist Brian Penikas (Pirates of the Caribbean trilogy, Indiana Jones and the Kingdom of the Crystal Skull) fulfilled Baker's duties.

The extended shooting schedule owed much to the fact that scenes where ghosts and human characters interacted had to be filmed twice; once with human characters acting on set, and then with the ghost characters acting against a blue screen. The two elements would later be digitally composited into one shot with the use of split screen photography. Such sequences required precise timing from the cast as they traded dialogue with characters who were merely blank air. The hardest challenge for the digital animators at Weta was creating the Grim Reaper, which went through many transformations before finding physical form. "We set out with the intention of doing the Reaper as a rod puppet, maybe shooting it in a water tank," Jackson commented. "We even thought of filming someone, dressed in costume, at different camera speeds." Test footage was shot with puppets and a man in a Reaper suit, but in the end, it was decided that using computer animation would be the easiest task. Another entirely computerized character called "the Gatekeeper", a winged cherub who helps guard the cemetery, was deleted from the final cut.

With digital effects work running behind schedule, Zemeckis convinced Wes Takahashi, an animation supervisor from visual effects company Industrial Light & Magic, to help work on The Frighteners. "The shots Zemeckis showed me were pretty remarkable," Takahashi reflected, "but there were still about 400 shots to do, and everyone was kind of worried." Takahashi was quickly drafted as a visual effects supervisor, and began looking at the schedule, trying to work out whether The Frighteners could be finished in time. "There was no way we'd make the deadline. I figured out a concerted plan involving Jackson and Zemeckis to convince Universal it was worthy of asking for more money." The executives at Universal proposed splitting some of the shots to visual effects companies in the United States, but Jackson, for whom the film was a chance to show New Zealand filmmaking could stand alongside Hollywood, convinced Universal otherwise. Instead, The Frighteners received an accelerated release date, four months earlier than planned, and an additional $6 million in financing, with fifteen digital animators and computer workstations (some were borrowed from Universal and other effects companies in the US).

Soundtrack

The film score was written and composed by Danny Elfman. It was released in 1996 on cassette and compact disc by Universal Records. The closing credits play a cover of Blue Öyster Cult's "(Don't Fear) The Reaper" performed by New Zealand alternative rock band The Mutton Birds. The Mutton Birds version of the song had been previously released as a B-side to their single "She's Been Talking" released in 1996. It plays also "Superstar", written by Bonnie Bramlett + Leon Russell and performed by Sonic Youth.

Critical reception was average; Jason Ankeny of album database AllMusic described the soundtrack as "imaginative" giving it three stars out of five. This was a lower rating on the site than Elfman's other scores of the era, such as Mission: Impossible, Mars Attacks! and Flubber. The soundtrack review website Filmtracks referred to the album as "lacking much cohesion or singular creativity".

Release
The intended release date was October 1996, but after Universal studio executives viewed a rough cut of The Frighteners, they were impressed enough to move the release date to their "summer blockbuster slot" on July 19, 1996. In addition, Universal offered the filmmaker the opportunity to make King Kong, which was not released until 2005. Jackson often disputed the Motion Picture Association of America (MPAA)'s decision on the film's rating. Aware that he was meant to be delivering Universal a PG-13 rated film, Jackson tried his best to omit graphic violence as much as possible, but the MPAA still believed The Frighteners deserved an R rating.

Box office
The Frighteners was released in the United States in 1,675 theaters, and opened at #5, earning $5,565,495 during its opening weekend, averaging $3,335 per theater. The film eventually grossed a worldwide total of $29,359,216. The Frighteners ended up being a box office disappointment, mostly due to competition from Independence Day; in interviews conducted years after The Frighteners release, Jackson commented he was disappointed by Universal's ubiquitous marketing campaign, including a poster which "didn't tell you anything about the picture", which he believed was the primary reason the film was not a financial success. Additionally, the film opened on the same day the Atlanta Summer Olympics began; when Jackson realized this and told the studio, they answered "'We don't think so; our research indicates that's not the case...' And I just thought how the hell do they know? There had only ever been three Olympic Games held in the United States in one hundred years!" Jackson acknowledged The Frighteners tone made it hard to pigeon-hole and sell, and his experience on the film made him understand the importance of marketing.

Critical reception

, 67% of the 42 reviewers selected by review aggregator Rotten Tomatoes gave the film a positive review, and the average score is 6.2/10. The website's critical consensus states, "Boasting top-notch special effects and exuberant direction from Peter Jackson, The Frighteners is visually striking but tonally uneven." Audiences polled by CinemaScore gave the film an average grade of "B−" on an A+ to F scale.

Kenneth Turan of the Los Angeles Times stated "Director Peter Jackson, at home with all kinds of excess in New Zealand, keeps everything spinning nicely, not even losing a step when the mood turns increasingly disturbing." Janet Maslin from The New York Times enjoyed The Frighteners, but "walked out the theater with mixed emotions," she commented that "Peter Jackson deserves more enthusiasm for expert, imaginative effects than for his live actors anyhow. These lively touches would leave The Frighteners looking more like a more frantic Beetlejuice if Jackson's film weren't so wearyingly overcrowded. The Frighteners is not immune to overkill, even though most of its characters are already dead." Jeff Vice of the Deseret News praised the acting in the film, with the performances of Fox and Alvarado in particular, but said that there were also "bits that push the taste barrier too far and which grind things to a screeching halt", and that if "Jackson had used the restraint he showed in Heavenly Creatures, the movie could have "been the best of its kind". Critic Christopher Null praised the film, as he described it as a mixture between Ghostbusters and Twin Peaks. Michael Drucker of IGN said that although the film would not make Jackson's top five of movies, it "is a harmless and fun dark comedy that you'll enjoy casually watching from time to time". The Frighteners received mixed reviews from critics from Jackson's native country, New Zealand.

Conversely, Todd McCarthy of Variety thought that the film should have remained an episode of Tales from the Crypt. Critic James Berardinelli believed that although The Frighteners wasn't "a bad film", it was "a disappointment, following Jackson's powerful, true-life matricide tale, Heavenly Creatures", and because of that "The Frighteners fell short of expectations by being just one of many in the long line of 1996 summer movies." Chicago Sun-Times Roger Ebert gave the film one star out of four, and felt that Jackson was more interested in prosthetic makeup designs, computer animation, and special effects than writing a cohesive storyline. Ebert and critic Gene Siskel gave it a "two thumbs down" rating on their TV show At the Movies with Gene Siskel and Roger Ebert. Chicago Reader critic Jonathan Rosenbaum, described the film's special effects as "ugly, aggressive" and "proliferating", saying that "trying to keep interested in [the special effects] was like trying to remain interested in a loudmouth shouting in [his] ear". Edward Guthmann of the San Francisco Chronicle stated that "instead of moving the horror genre in new directions, The Frighteners simply falls apart from its barrage of visual effects and the overmixed onslaught of Danny Elfman's music score". The Austin Chronicles Joey O'Brien, said that although the screenplay was "practically loaded with wild ideas, knowingly campy dialogue and offbeat characterizations", it "switched gears" too fast and too frequently that "the audience is left struggling to catch up as [The Frighteners] twists and turns its way unmercifully towards a literally out-of-this-world finale".

Accolades
At the 23rd Saturn Awards, the Academy of Science Fiction, Fantasy and Horror Films honored Jackson with nominations for Best Director and Best Writing, the latter he shared with wife Fran Walsh. The Frighteners also was nominated for Best Horror Film, and for its Special Effects, Make-up (Rick Baker) and Music (Danny Elfman). Michael J. Fox and Jeffrey Combs were also nominated for their work.

Home media
"The Frighteners" was released on Laserdisc in 1996 in a standard release with Dolby surround on both Digital and Analog channels.

In 1998 Universal Home Video as part of the Signature Series collection released a special edition.
This includes the first release of the 12 minute longer "Directors Cut" plus the following extras:
Feature commentary by director Peter Jackson
4 hour documentary 'The Making Of The Frighteners' directed by Peter Jackson featuring cast interviews, rehearsals, storyboarding, miniatures and special effects
Deleted scenes
Theatrical trailer

The later DVD was a re-release of this with inferior audio.

The Frighteners was first released on DVD in August 1998, but included no special features.

To coincide with the release of Jackson's King Kong, Universal Studios Home Entertainment issued a double-sided director's cut DVD of the film in November 2005, which featured a version of The Frighteners that was 12 minutes longer. The other side includes a documentary prepared by Jackson and WingNut Films originally for the Laserdisc release. The theatrical and director's cut were also made available in HD DVD in 2007 and Blu-ray in 2011.

See also
 List of ghost films
 The Purple Testament

References

External links

 
 
 

1996 films
1996 comedy films
1996 horror films
1990s comedy horror films
1990s ghost films
1990s serial killer films
1990s supernatural horror films
American black comedy films
American comedy horror films
American serial killer films
American supernatural horror films
New Zealand comedy films
New Zealand horror films
New Zealand comedy horror films
Films about the Federal Bureau of Investigation
Films directed by Peter Jackson
Films with screenplays by Peter Jackson
Films with screenplays by Fran Walsh
Films scored by Danny Elfman
Films set in the 1960s
Films shot in Oklahoma
Films shot in New Zealand
WingNut Films films
Universal Pictures films
Films about exorcism
Films about the afterlife
Resurrection in film
1990s English-language films
1990s American films
Films produced by Peter Jackson